Church Of Atrocity is an album released by black metal band Clandestine Blaze in 2006.

Track listing
"Church of Atrocity" - 05:01
"Ashes of the Eternal Wanderer" - 11:40
"Storm of Purification" - 04:50
"Last Morning of Old North" - 07:42
"Frozen Angel" - 05:46
"Unforgiven Acts" - 07:42

Release information 

The CD version was released by Northern Heritage 2006

Clandestine Blaze albums
2006 albums